USS Baltimore may refer to:

, was a 12-gun brigantine that served in the Continental Navy from 1777 to 1780.
, was a 20-gun ship built in 1798.
, was a side-wheel steamer captured in 1861.
, was a protected cruiser commissioned in 1890.

The Baltimore crisis, an 1891 diplomatic incident involving USS Baltimore (C-3)

, was a heavy cruiser commissioned in 1943.
, was a Los Angeles-class nuclear attack submarine, decommissioned on 10 July 1998.

See also

United States Navy ship names